Micaela Wilson (born 3 November 1992 in Melbourne, Australia) is an Australian netball player. 

In her career, Wilson has played for the New South Wales Swifts and Melbourne Vixens. Most recently she played for the Collingwood Magpies in 2017 before being cut from the team at the end of the season.

She predominantly plays goal keeper or goal defence, but has also played wing defence in her career.

National Representation
 2013 Australian 21/U World Youth Championship Team

Netball Career Facts
 2014 NSW Swifts replacement player
 2013 World Youth Championship Silver Medal
 2013 Australian Institute of Sport Scholarship recipient

References

External links
 2011 Melbourne Vixens profile

Australian netball players
Melbourne Vixens players
1992 births
Living people
Netball players from Melbourne
New South Wales Swifts players
Collingwood Magpies Netball players
Victorian Netball League players
Australian Institute of Sport netball players
Victorian Fury players
Australian Netball League players